The Club of Nobody's Friends is a private dining club with origins in the High Church tradition of the Church of England. It is one of the oldest of the London dining clubs and frequently meets in Lambeth Palace. Its motto is Pro Ecclesia et Rege.

History

The club, often referred to simply as Nobody's Friends or Nobody's, was founded in honour of William Stevens and first met on 21 June 1800 at the Crown and Anchor Tavern in the Strand. Its inaugural dinner consisted of thirteen men who would later form the movement known as the Hackney Phalanx. In the late 1880s Nobody’s occasionally met at the Freemasons' Tavern, which served as a meeting place for a variety of notable organisations from the eighteenth century until it was demolished to make way for the Connaught Hotel in 1909.

Stevens was a wealthy hosier who became a writer and philanthropist, leading figure in the High Church movement, and Treasurer of Queen Anne's Bounty. He wrote theological pamphlets under the pen name of Nobody which gave the club its curious name.

The club grew to consist of 50 members, half clergymen and half laymen, and met three times a year. Between 1800 and 1900 membership included three archbishops, forty-nine bishops, twenty Cathedral deans, many peers and baronets, and members of the House of Commons. It also included privy councillors, judges, and fellows of both the Royal Society and the Society of Antiquaries.

A Nobody's menu from 1891 shows a club dinner at the Hotel Metropole, London consisting of ten or more courses, standard at that time in formal Victorian dining. It may be assumed that presentation of the courses was in the service à la russe tradition.

Recent times
It is recorded that in 1962 a former bishop of Norwich, Launcelot Fleming, left Nobody's the "worse for wear" and was later found by friends singing "I’m a space Bishop" whilst wearing a motorbike helmet he had acquired on the journey home. The story may be apocryphal, but it is said that he met his future wife among the friends who discovered him in this state.

Writing in his diaries The Old Boys' Network, John Rae the celebrated headmaster of Westminster School said of a 1984 dinner:

It is believed that women have since been admitted as members, but this is not known for definite.

In 2005, Conservative peer Lord Brooke speaking in the House of Lords on the death of Lord Belstead said 

In 2014, the retired bishop of Bath and Wells, Rt Revd John Bickersteth, when asked how he had become a bishop described how after being 'spotted' at Nobody's, "You used to have lunch at the Athenaeum." Though he recalled that in his case, the luncheon leading to episcopal elevation took place at The Commonwealth Club.

The current President of Nobody's is believed to be Sir Philip Mawer, former Secretary General of the Church of England's Synod and current chair of Allchurches Trust. He was President in 2015. It is not known whether he has been replaced.

IICSA
In 2018 the club was subject of a question in the IICSA hearing into abuse in the Church of England. Lord Lloyd had sent a letter of influence in the Peter Ball case to Archbishop Carey prefaced with the phrase "May I presume on a brief acquaintanceship at dinners of Nobody's Friends?" When asked about the club in his evidence to the Inquiry, Lord Lloyd described Nobody's Friends as "simply a club, half consisting of the clergy, members of the clergy, and half consisting of members of the laity, which dine together probably twice a year, very often in Lambeth Palace." The IICSA counsel pointed out that the Daily Mail had once described it as "centred on a strong core of bishops, ex-Tory ministers and former military top brass, a highly secretive, all-male group representing Britain's most entrenched professions and institutions." Lord Lloyd replied, "That's a typical Daily Mail description of something they don't particularly like, but I can assure you that Nobody's Friends is a perfectly ordinary dining club..." The same article that IICSA drew upon in the hearing indicated that Prime Minister Tony Blair had been keen to join the club in 2003.

Stephen Parsons commented in an influential blog, following the IICSA hearing, that the forum Nobody’s Friends provided for influence in the Peter Ball case suggested a “toxic masculinity” in the Church of England. He went on to say:

Bibliography 
 Biographical List of the Members of "The Club of Nobody's Friends" since Its Foundation 21 June 1800 to 30 September 1885 (London: Privately Printed, 1885).
 The Club of "Nobody's Friends," Since Its Foundation on 21 June 1800 to 29 April 1902 Volume II. (London: Printed for Private Circulation, 1902)
 Geoffrey Rowell, The Club of 'Nobody's Friends' 1800-2000: A Memoir on Its Two-hundredth Anniversary (Edinburgh: Pentland Press, 2000)

See also

Nikæan Club
Gentlemen's Clubs in London

References

External links
Eating Without Jesus

Dining clubs
Religious organizations established in 1800
Anglo-Catholicism
Clubs and societies in England
Organizations established in 1800
Tractarians
Church of England societies and organisations